Trapped may refer to:

Films
 Trapped (1931 film), a crime drama short starring Lina Basquette
 Trapped (1937 film), an American western starring Charles Starrett
 Trapped (1949 film), a semidocumentary film noir directed by Richard Fleischer
 Trapped (1973 film), a television film starring James Brolin
 Trapped (1982 film), a horror film starring Henry Silva
 Trapped (1989 film), a television film starring Kathleen Quinlan
 Trapped (2001 film), a television film starring William McNamara
 Trapped (2002 film), a thriller starring Charlize Theron
 Trapped (2013 film), an Iranian drama film
 Trapped (2015 film), an Armenian action thriller starring Sos Janibekyan
 Trapped (2016 American  film), an American documentary film
 Trapped (2016 Hindi film), an Indian survival film
 Trapped! (2006), a television film starring Alexandra Paul
 Trapped: Haitian Nights, a 2010 thriller starring Vivica A. Fox

Literature
 Trapped (Gardner novel), a 2002 novel in the League of Peoples series by James Alan Gardner
 Trapped (Hearne novel), a 2012 novel in the Iron Druid Chronicles series by Kevin Hearne
 Trapped, a children's novel by Peg Kehret
 "Trapped", a 1989 short story by Dean Koontz, later issued as a graphic novel
 Trapped, a Fear Street novel by R. L. Stine

Music
 Trapped! (album), by Rage, 1992

Songs
 "Trapped" (Colonel Abrams song), 1985
 "Trapped" (Jimmy Cliff song), 1972; covered by Bruce Springsteen and the E Street Band, 1985
 "Trapped" (Tupac Shakur song), 1991
 "Trapped", by Indus Creed, 1995
 "Trapped", by Chastity Belt from Time to Go Home, 2015
 "Trapped", by E-40 from Revenue Retrievin': Graveyard Shift, 2011
 "Trapped", by the Living End from The Living End, 1998
 "Trapped", by Proof from the compilation album Eminem Presents: The Re-Up, 2006
 "Trapped", by Soulidium from Children of Chaos, 2007
 "Trapped", by Yo Gotti from Untrapped, 2020

Television

Series
 Trapped (1950 TV series), an American dramatic anthology series
 Trapped (2007 TV series), a National Geographic documentary series
 Trapped! (TV series), a 2007–2010 British children's programme
 Trapped (Australian TV series), a 2008–2009 children's drama series
 Trapped (Icelandic TV series), a 2015–2019 mystery series

Episodes
 "Trapped" (CSI: NY), 2005
 "Trapped" (The Honeymooners), 1956
 "Trapped" (The Lost World), 2002
 "Trapped" (Tugs), 1989

See also
 Trap (disambiguation)
 Trapt, an American post-grunge/alternative metal band
 Trapt (album), a 2002 album by the band
 Trapt (video game), a 2005 PlayStation 2 game